pH partition is the tendency for acids to accumulate in basic fluid compartments, and bases to accumulate in acidic compartments. The reason for this phenomenon is that acids become negatively electric charged in basic fluids, since they donate a proton. On the other hand, bases become positively electric charged in acid fluids, since they receive a proton. Since electric charge decrease the membrane permeability of substances, once an acid enters a basic fluid and becomes electrically charged, then it cannot escape that compartment with ease and therefore accumulates, and vice versa with bases.

See also 
 Ion trapping
 Acid dissociation constant - pKa
 Henderson-Hasselbalch equation

Acid–base chemistry